The Zillertal Railway or Zillertalbahn is a  gauge independent railway running along the valley of the river Ziller (Zillertal) in Tyrol, Austria. The  line starts in Jenbach and terminates in Mayrhofen.

Background
Running through a valley in a high-amenity rural area, the line is used by tourists and for commuter transport by local people. Railway enthusiasts from all over the world are attracted to it because of its use of steam engines and its small track gauge.

Most of the passenger train services operate using modern diesel locomotives and railcars but the Zillertal Railway also has several steam locomotives which are used with heritage verandah rolling stock for special trains targeting tourists. Goods traffic is carried; standard gauge wagons to and from the main line network are carried on transporter wagons.

In Jenbach the Zillertal Railway meets the ÖBB standard gauge line between Salzburg and Innsbruck and the metre gauge Achenseebahn. Jenbach is the only location in Austria where railways of three different track-gauges meet.

History

The line was opened on 31 July 1902, serving the needs of residents of the upper Ziller valley and giving them access to Jenbach and the main line railway in the Inn Valley.

In 1956 the present day company name, Zillertaler Verkehrsbetriebe AG, (i.e. The Zillertaler Transport Company) was adopted when the company absorbed a local bus operation that had been founded in 1935.

In 1965 the line was extended by 2.5 km to bring materials and equipment to a power station; the extension line has subsequently been removed once more. However at that time two diesel locomotives and some transporter wagons were acquired and the Zillertalbahn became the first railway in Austria to use "Zugfunk"—train control by radio.

In 1976 extraction of magnesium ore from Tux came to an end; this traffic had been an important source of income for the line since 1928.

Since 2005, points on the line have been operated remotely from the Jenbach Control Centre using fibre-optic technology.

Route
As a consequence of the valley's shape, the railway follows the river Ziller, as does the main road (Zillertalstraße). Both road and rail remain mostly on the eastern "right" bank. It is single track for most of the route, broadening to two or even three tracks in some stations. Road crossings are mostly level, some protected by barriers.

The sections Ramsau–Hippach–Zell am Ziller (3.33 km) and Kaltenbach-Stumm–Angersbach–Ahrnbach (2.0 km) have been made double track.

At Fügen-Hart there is a siding to serve a timber company.

Current operation
In 2010 the annual freight traffic amounted to 320,000 tonnes, predominantly in connection with the forest products industry. 1.54 million passengers were carried in that year, a half-hourly service (of train and bus journeys combined) being introduced.

Rolling stock to the United Kingdom
Some of the Zillertal Railway's redundant rolling stock was donated by the railway to the Welshpool and Llanfair Light Railway in the UK. In July 2019 the Welshpool & Llanfair Light Railway announced that it had signed a contract with the Zillertalbahn to hire newly overhauled U-class 0-6-2T locomotive, No. 2 'Zillertal', for approximately two years.

Ownership
The Zillertaler Verkehrsbetriebe AG (ZVB) is (2010) owned by the Jenbach Marktgemeinde (i.e. local government unit) and other local communities (61%); individual shareholders (34%); and the Austrian state (5%).

Future 
In 2018, the ZVB unveiled its plans to move away from the ageing diesel trainsets in favour of hydrogen-powered units by 2025. The Zillertalbahn will then be the first fully hydrogen-powered small-gauge railway in the world. Hydrogen will be produced locally in Mayrhofen, where fuelling will take place in an all-new station. The five hydrogen-fuelled trainsets were set to achieve operational status by 2022, but financing issues postponed operation to winter 2024/25.

Plans for an alteration of the trajectory were also announced. The section Aschau - Zell am Ziller will be completely replaced by a trajectory that more closely follows the Ziller river and directly connects to the Zillertaler ARENA skiing lifts near Zell am Ziller. Moreover, the historic Zillerbrücke will be bypassed and is destined for use by pedestrians and cyclists only. The section that runs through Zell am Ziller will be levelled and incorporated into the road.

However, further financing issues have postponed the proposed infrastructure modernisations indefinitely. As of January 2023, no construction works have commenced, nor have any of the hydrogen-powered trainsets been ordered.

References

External links
 
 Official website of the Zillertal Railway

Railway lines opened in 1902
760 mm gauge railways in Austria